Alison Riske is the defending champion.
Riske successfully defended her title, defeating Akgul Amanmuradova in the final.

Seeds

Main draw

Finals

Top half

Bottom half

References
 Main Draw
 Qualifying Draw

Open GDF Suez de Touraine - Singles